Aftab Ahmad Khan Sherpao (born 20 August 1944) is a Pakistani politician who is the current chairman of the centre-left Pashtun nationalist Qaumi Watan Party, after previously being a member of the Pakistan Peoples Party. He was a member of the National Assembly of Pakistan from November 2002 to May 2018.

Sherpao previously served as the Federal Interior Minister of Pakistan. Prior to this assignment he was the Federal Minister for Water and Power, Minister for Kashmir Affairs and Northern Areas and States & Frontier Regions and Minister for Interprovincial Coordination. Sherpao has also served as the 14th and 18th Chief Minister of the Khyber Pakhtunkhwa province.

Early life and education
Aftab Khan Sherpao was born on 20 August 1944.

Sherpao received his early from Lawrence College Murree, and Edwardes College, Peshawar.

He joined Pakistan Military Academy with 34th Long Course in 1964. After passing out from Pakistan Military Academy in 1965, he joined Pakistan Army where he remained in the service for 12 years during which he rose to the rank of Major.  While in military, he took part in Indo-Pakistani War of 1965 and Indo-Pakistani War of 1971.

He is brother of Hayat Sherpao.

Political career

Sherpao started his political career with Pakistan Peoples Party in 1975 after taking retirement from Pakistan Army on the advice of then Prime Minister of Pakistan Zulfikar Ali Bhutto after his elder brother Hayat Sherpao was assassinated in a bomb blast in Peshawar.

He was elected to National Assembly of Pakistan for the first time in 1977 Pakistani general election on Pakistan Peoples Party seat. from NA-3.

He boycotted 1985 Pakistani general election.

He was re-elected to the National Assembly in 1988 Pakistani general election.

He was elected as the Chief Minister of Khyber Pakhtunkhwa in 1988 and remained in the office from 2 December 1988 till 8 August 1990.

He became the Leader of the Opposition in the Provincial Assembly of Khyber Pakhtunkhwa following 1990 Pakistani general election.

He was re-elected as the Chief Minister of Khyber Pakhtunkhwa in 1994 following 1993 Pakistani general election, in which he defeated Afzal Khamosh of the Mazdoor Kisan Party by a narrow margin of 54 votes.

He remained Leader of the Opposition in the Provincial Assembly of Khyber Pakhtunkhwa from 1993 to 1997.

He was re-elected to the National Assembly in 1997 Pakistani general election.

He remained senior Vice-Chairman of the Pakistan Peoples Party from 1997 to 1999 and  leader of Pakistan Peoples Party in the Provincial Assembly of Khyber Pakhtunkhwa from 1997 to 1999.

In 1999, he developed differences with Benazir Bhutto. It was reported that differences between Sherpao and Benazir Bhutto were cropped after the defeat of PPP in 1997 Pakistani general election. Benazir Bhutto suspected that Sherpao played a role over the dismissal of her government. Sherpao denied the claims.

After 1999 Pakistani coup d'état, he went into self-exile in the United Kingdom due to multiple corruption cases. Upon return to Pakistan for 2002 Pakistani general election, he was jailed on corruption charges.

In 2002, he created his own faction, of Pakistan Peoples Party-Sherpao and late 2002, was elected unopposed as the chairman of his own faction, Pakistan Peoples Party-Sherpao.

He was re-elected to the National Assembly in Pakistani general election, 2002. In November 2002, he was appointed as the Minister for Water and Power with the additional portfolio of Minister for Inter-Provincial Coordination in the federal cabinet. In December 2002, Sherpao was given additional charge of Kashmir Affairs and Northern Areas and State of Frontier Region.

In 2004, he was appointed as Minister for Interior in the federal cabinet.

After getting re-elected to the National Assembly in 2008 Pakistani general election from his home constituency, NA-8, Charsadda, he formed Qaumi Watan Party.

He was re-elected to the National Assembly in 2013 Pakistani general election.

Assassinations attempts
In April 2007, he was injured in a suicide attack in Charsadda after a suicide bomber blew himself in a political rally which killed at least 22 people. It was the first attack on him.

In December 2007, second assassination attempt was made when a suicide bomb blast targeted Sherpao which killed at least 57 in a mosque in Charsadda.

In April 2015, Sherpao was targeted in a suicide attack in Charsadda for the third time. Sherpao survived the attack.

External links
 Official Twitter

 Official Facebook

References

Living people
1944 births
Pakistani MNAs 1977
Pakistani MNAs 1997–1999
Pakistani MNAs 2002–2007
Pakistani MNAs 2008–2013
Pakistani MNAs 2013–2018
Pakistan Army officers
Pakistani prisoners and detainees
Pakistani exiles
North-West Frontier Province MPAs 1988–1990
North-West Frontier Province MPAs 1993–1996
Government of Shaukat Aziz
Qaumi Watan Party politicians
Edwardes College alumni
Lawrence College Ghora Gali alumni
Pashtun people
Aftab Ahmad
Interior ministers of Pakistan
Chief Ministers of Khyber Pakhtunkhwa
Pakistani political party founders
Pakistan People's Party politicians